The SRM Jinhaishi (金海狮) is a midsize MPV produced by Chinese car manufacturer Shineray Group under the SRM marque. 

SRM used to produce Jinbei minivans, and serves as a joint venture between Brilliance Auto Group and Dongfang Xinyuan （鑫源） Holdings (Oriental Shineray Holdings). 80% is owned by Xinyuan Holdings and a subsidiary of Beijing North Industry owns 20% which is no longer part of Brilliance. Currently it produces microvans under the Shineray (now SRM) and SWM brands.

Overview

Based on a modified platform of the Jinbei Haise X30L, the SRM Jinhaishi features near identical rear end to the Jinbei Haise X30L while featuring a completely redesigned front cabin. The SRM Jinhaishi was released by Brilliance Auto in September, 2021 and offers up to 18 seating configurations, including a 2, 5, 6, 7, and 9 seater models. 

Built by Brilliance Xinyuan Chongqing Auto (华晨鑫源), originally the Chongqing branch of Brilliance Auto, the SRM Jinhaishi was offered with a 1.5 liter naturally aspirated engine producing 78kW, a 1.6 liter naturally aspirated engine producing 85kW, and a 2.0liter naturally aspirated engine producing 101kW, all paired with a 5-speed manual transmission.

References

Vans
Minivans
Rear-wheel-drive vehicles
Cars introduced in 2021